Zytsovo is a rural locality (a village) in Domshinskoye Rural Settlement, Sheksninsky District, Vologda Oblast, Russia. The population was 16 as of 2002.

Geography 
Zytsovo is located 47 km southeast of Sheksna (the district's administrative centre) by road. Gorodskoye is the nearest rural locality.

References 

Rural localities in Sheksninsky District